Alsóújlak is a village in Vas County, Hungary.

Notable people
Ferenc Szabó (1921–2009), footballer

Populated places in Vas County